Amorphoscelis philippina is a species of praying mantis found in the Philippines.

See also
List of mantis genera and species

References

Amorphoscelis
Arthropods of the Philippines
Insects described in 1926